Yarissa Rodríguez Taveras (born April 12, 1990), better known by the name of her YouTube channel Yarissa, is a Dominican YouTuber known for her fashion videos.

Career 
Yarissa began making her videos in July 2015. She earned her first 1,000 subscribers in less than two months. Her videos focus on makeup, outfits, recipes and vlogging in general.

In 2016 she gained 100,000 subscribers on her channel.

In 2017, she signed a contract of representation with Univisión Network.

As of December 2019, she has more than 3.5 million subscribers on YouTube and has the second most subscribers in the Dominican Republic. She produces content for the Internet and television.

Personal life 
Yarissa was born in Santiago de los Caballeros, Dominican Republic. She graduated in 2014 with a degree in social communication with an emphasis in audiovisual production, at the Pontificia Universidad Católica Madre y Maestra.

She is married to Dominican businessman Wellington Díaz who is nicknamed "Esposillo".

She divorced him in December 2021 because of múltiples differences. Now she lives happily and still single.

Awards and nominations

References

External links
 

1990 births
Dominican Republic television presenters
Dominican Republic YouTubers
Living people
People from Santo Domingo
Dominican Republic women television presenters